Adrien Goetz (born 1966 in Caen, Calvados) is a French Art History Professor, art critic and novelist. He graduated from the École Normale Supérieure. His work appeared in  Zurban, and Beaux-Arts Magazine.
He is Senior Lecturer in Art History at the Sorbonne., and the Editor of Grande Galerie, the magazine published by the Louvre Museum.
Adrien Goetz was elected to the Académie des Beaux-Arts - Institut de France in December 2018.

Awards
 Prix des Deux Magots in 2004 for his novel La Dormeuse de Naples (The Sleeper of Naples).
prix du livre d'art du Syndicat National des Antiquaires, for Ingres Collages
2007 grand prix François-Victor Noury of the Institut de France, from the Académie Française

Bibliography

Novels
 Webcam, 2003, Le Passage, 2003, ; Points, 2006, 
 La Dormeuse de Naples, Seuil, 2004
 Marie-Antoinette, 2005
 À bas la nuit! B. Grasset, 2006, ; LGF/Le Livre de Poche, 2009, 
 Intrigue à l'anglaise (Grasset) 2007
 Intrigue à Versailles Grasset, 2009, ; Hachette, 2010, 
 Le coiffeur de Chateaubriand (Grasset) 2010
 Villa Kérylos (Grasset) 2017, English translation Villa of Delirium (New Vessel Press) 2020

Art criticism
La Grande Galerie des peintures, itinéraires dans les collections (preface Jean-Jacques Aillagon, coédition Centre Pompidou-Louvre-Musée d'Orsay), 2003.
Au Louvre, Les arts face à face (foreword Henri Loyrette, président directeur du musée du Louvre, coédition Hazan-Musée du Louvre), 2004.
Louvre: the arts face to face, Translator David Wharry, Illustrator Erich Lessing, Hazan, 2005, 
Marie-Antoinette (Éditions Assouline), 2005, .
Ingres Collages (coédition Le Passage-Musée Ingres de Montauban), 2005.
L' Atelier de Cézanne, 2006

References

External links 

Dialogues, 5 Questions à Adrien Goetz
"Ingres Collages", Adrien Goetz
Author's website

1966 births
Living people
Writers from Caen
21st-century French novelists
École Normale Supérieure alumni
Prix des Deux Magots winners
Roger Nimier Prize winners
French male novelists
Chevaliers of the Légion d'honneur
Commandeurs of the Ordre des Arts et des Lettres
21st-century French male writers